Erinnyis alope, the Alope sphinx, is a moth of the family Sphingidae. It lives from the northern part of South America, through Central America, up to Northern Mexico and the very south of the United States, although strays have been recorded as far north as Arkansas and Kansas.

Subspecies
Erinnyis alope alope (from northern Argentina and Uruguay north through Central America, Mexico, and the West Indies to southern Florida, southern Texas, southern New Mexico and southern Arizona)
Erinnyis alope dispersa Kernbach, 1962 (Galapagos Islands)

References

External links
Alope Sphinx Moths of America

Erinnyis
Moths described in 1770
Moths of North America
Taxa named by Dru Drury